is a former Japanese football player.

Playing career
Nakahara was born in Yamaguchi on 18 November 1984. After graduating from high school, he joined J1 League club Vegalta Sendai in 2003. He played several matches as forward, Vegalta was relegated to J2 League end of 2003 season. Although he played many matches in 2004, he could hardly play in the match in 2005. In 2006, he was loaned to J1 club Albirex Niigata. In 2007, he returned to Vegalta. He played many matches as substitute forward every season and Vegalta won the champions in 2009 season. 

Although he played many matches in J1 in 2010, his opportunity to play decreased from 2011. In 2015, he moved to J2 club Avispa Fukuoka. He played as regular forward and was promoted to J1 end of 2015 season. However he could hardly play in the match and Avispa was relegated to J2 in a year. In 2018, he moved to Japan Football League club ReinMeer Aomori. He retired end of 2018 season.

Club statistics
Updated to 8 January 2019.

References

External links

Profile at Avispa Fukuoka

1984 births
Living people
Association football people from Yamaguchi Prefecture
Japanese footballers
J1 League players
J2 League players
Japan Football League players
Vegalta Sendai players
Albirex Niigata players
Avispa Fukuoka players
ReinMeer Aomori players
Association football forwards